"Welcome to My World" is a single by Belgian female singer Iris. The song was written by Alain Croisy, A. Jarnija, A. Dorjbayar. It was released in Belgium as a digital download on 19 June 2012 as the third single from her debut studio album Seventeen (2012).

Track listing
Digital download
 "Welcome to My World" - 3:23

Credits and personnel
Lead vocals – Iris
Producers – Roel De Ruijter
Lyrics – Alain Croisy, A. Jarnija, A. Dorjbayar
Label: SonicAngel

Charts

Release history

References

2012 singles
Iris (singer) songs
2011 songs